The Slaughter-House Cases, 83 U.S. (16 Wall.) 36 (1873), was a landmark U.S. Supreme Court decision consolidating several cases that held that the Privileges or Immunities Clause of the Fourteenth Amendment to the U.S. Constitution only protects the legal rights that are associated with federal U.S. citizenship, not those that pertain to state citizenship. Though the decision in the Slaughter-House Cases minimized the impact of the Privileges or Immunities Clause on state law, the Supreme Court would later incorporate the Bill of Rights to strike down state laws on the basis of other clauses. In 2010 the Court rejected argument in McDonald v. Chicago to overrule the established precedent of Slaughterhouse and decided instead to incorporate the Second Amendment via the Due Process Clause of the Fourteenth Amendment.

Seeking to improve sanitary conditions, the Louisiana legislature and the city of New Orleans had established a corporation charged with regulating the slaughterhouse industry. Members of the Butchers' Benevolent Association challenged the constitutionality of the corporation, claiming that it violated the Fourteenth Amendment. That amendment had been ratified in the aftermath of the American Civil War with the primary intention of protecting civil rights of millions of newly emancipated freedmen in the Southern United States, but the butchers argued that the amendment protected their right to "sustain their lives through labor".

In the majority opinion written by Associate Justice Samuel Freeman Miller, the Court held to a narrower interpretation of the Fourteenth Amendment than the plaintiffs urged, ruling that it did not restrict the police powers exercised by Louisiana because the Privileges or Immunities Clause protected only those rights guaranteed by the United States, not individual states. In effect, the clause was interpreted to convey limited protection pertinent to a small minority of rights, such as the right to seek federal office. 

In a dissenting opinion, Associate Justice Stephen J. Field wrote that Miller's opinion effectively rendered the Fourteenth Amendment a "vain and idle enactment".

Background

One writer described New Orleans in the mid-nineteenth century as plagued by "intestines and portions of putrefied animal matter lodged [around the drinking pipes]" whenever the tide from the Mississippi River was low; the offal came from the city's slaughterhouses. A mile and a half upstream from the city, 1,000 butchers gutted more than 300,000 animals per year. Animal entrails (known as offal), dung, blood, and urine contaminated New Orleans's drinking water, which was implicated in cholera and yellow fever outbreaks among the population.

To try to control the problem, a New Orleans grand jury recommended that the slaughterhouses be moved south, but since many of the slaughterhouses were outside city limits, the grand jury's recommendations carried no weight. The city appealed to the state legislature. As a result, in 1869, the Louisiana legislature passed "An Act to Protect the Health of the City of New Orleans, to Locate the Stock Landings and Slaughter Houses, and to incorporate the Crescent City Livestock Landing and Slaughter-House Company", which allowed the city of New Orleans to create a corporation that centralized all slaughterhouse operations in the city. At the time, New York City, San Francisco, Boston, Milwaukee, and Philadelphia had similar provisions to confine butchers' establishments to particular areas in order to keep offal from contaminating the water supply.

The legislature chartered a private corporation, the Crescent City Live-Stock Landing and Slaughter-House Company, to run a Grand Slaughterhouse at the southern part of the city, opposite the Mississippi River. Crescent City would not slaughter beef itself but act as a franchise corporation, by renting out space to other butchers in the city for a fee, under a designated maximum.

The statute also granted "sole and exclusive privilege of conducting and carrying on the livestock landing and slaughterhouse business within the limits and privilege granted by the act, and that all such animals shall be landed at the stock landings and slaughtered at the slaughterhouses of the company, and nowhere else. Penalties are enacted for infractions of this provision, and prices fixed for the maximum charges of the company for each steamboat and for each animal landed". The exclusivity would last for a period of 25 years. All other slaughterhouses would be closed up, forcing butchers to slaughter within the operation set up by Crescent City. The statute forbade Crescent City from favoring one butcher over another by promising harsh penalties for refusal to sell space to any butcher. All animals on the premises would be inspected by an officer appointed by the governor of the state.

Over 400 members of the Butchers' Benevolent Association joined together to sue to stop Crescent City's takeover of the slaughterhouse industry. In the background of his majority opinion, Supreme Court Justice Samuel Freeman Miller reiterated the concerns of the butchers:

The lower courts had found in favor of Crescent City in all cases. 

Six cases were appealed to the Supreme Court. The butchers based their claims on the due process, privileges or immunities, and equal protection clauses of the Fourteenth Amendment, which had been ratified by the states five years earlier. It had been passed with the intention of protecting the civil rights of the millions of newly emancipated freedmen in the South, who had been granted citizenship in the United States. 

The butchers' attorney, former Supreme Court Justice John Archibald Campbell, who had retired from the federal bench because of his Confederate loyalties, represented persons in a number of cases in New Orleans to obstruct Radical Reconstruction. Although the Fourteenth Amendment was passed mainly to protect the freedmen in the South, the language of Section 1 is not racially limited. Campbell used it to argue for a new, broad reading of the Fourteenth Amendment, in order to allow butchers of any race to "sustain their lives through labor".

Decision
On April 14, 1873, the Supreme Court issued a 5–4 decision in favor of the slaughterhouse company upholding the constitutionality of Louisiana's use of its police powers to regulate butchers.

Opinion of the Court

Five justices formed the majority and joined an opinion written by justice Samuel Freeman Miller. Miller framed the Court's opinion around the notion that the Thirteenth and Fourteenth Amendments were primarily meant to protect former black slaves.

With this view of the Thirteenth and Fourteenth Amendments' purposes, the Court interpreted their protections very narrowly. First, the Court rejected the butchers' equal protection arguments, saying that it "doubt[ed] very much" that the Equal Protection Clause would ever prohibit anything other than state laws discriminating against black people as a class. Next, the Court rejected the butchers' due process arguments, saying that "under no construction of [the Due Process Clause] that we have ever seen, or any that we deem admissible", could the state's restrictions on the butchers' work constitute a "deprivation of property" under the Due Process Clause.

The Court then turned to the Privileges or Immunities Clause, which it viewed just as narrowly as it had the Due Process and Equal Protection Clauses. The Court held that protecting people from state government actions was not the Privileges or Immunities Clause's purpose, and that the clause was never meant to be a basis on which courts could strike down state laws. 

Having adopted this narrow interpretation, the Court ruled that the Privileges or Immunities Clause only protects rights that pertain to federal U.S. citizenship, not state citizenship. This interpretation meant that the Privileges or Immunities Clause did not protect Americans' broad rights as citizens of their individual states, which Miller said "embrace[d] nearly every civil right for the establishment and protection of which organized government is instituted".

The Court derived this state-federal citizenship distinction from Miller's reading of the Fourteenth Amendment's Citizenship Clause, which had conferred national U.S. citizenship upon freed black slaves and superseded the Court's 1857 decision Dred Scott v. Sandford. Miller accepted that Article IV of the U.S. Constitution's original Privileges and Immunities Clause, on which the Fourteenth Amendment's Privileges or Immunities Clause had been modeled, protected Americans' broad state rights. But Miller said the Fourteenth Amendment's language was distinguishable from the Article IV clause. Miller wrote—misquoting the Fourteenth Amendment's text—that the Privileges or Immunities Clause "speaks only of privileges and immunities of citizens of the United States, and does not speak of those of citizens of the several states". He concluded that "the entire domain of the privileges and immunities of the states ... lay within the constitutional and legislative power of the states, and without that of the Federal government".

Miller wrote that the Court was not required to define all the "privileges and immunities" of federal citizenship, but listed ones such as the right to petition the U.S. Congress, the right to vote in federal elections, the right to engage in interstate travel and commerce, the right to enter federal lands, and several others such as "the right to peaceably assemble and petition for redress of grievances" and "the privilege of the writ of habeas corpus". Miller dispensed with any further listing of U.S. federal citizenship rights, saying that the Court was "of the opinion that the rights claimed by [the New Orleans butchers], if they have any existence, are not privileges and immunities of citizens of the United States within the meaning of the [Privileges or Immunities Clause of the Fourteenth Amendment]".

Dissents

Four justices dissented from the Court's decision, and three of them wrote dissenting opinions. 

Justice Stephen J. Field protested that Miller's narrow reading of the Fourteenth Amendment rendered it "a vain and idle enactment, which accomplished nothing and most unnecessarily excited Congress and the people on its passage". Field accepted Campbell's reading of the amendment as not confined to protection of freed slaves but embracing the common law presumption in favor of an individual right to pursue a legitimate occupation. Field's reading of the due process clause of the amendment would prevail in future cases in which the court read the amendment broadly to protect personal interests against hostile state laws.

Justice Joseph P. Bradley's dissent disagreed with the Court's interpretation of the rights protected by the Privileges or Immunities Clause. He listed many rights found in the U.S. Constitution and the Bill of Rights amendments, such as the rights to trial by jury, free exercise of religion, and freedom from unreasonable search and seizure. Bradley concluded: "These, and still others are specified in the Constitution or in early amendments of it, as among the privileges and immunities of citizens of the United States, or, what is still stronger for the force of the argument, the rights of all persons, whether citizens or not."

Justice Noah H. Swayne's dissent criticized the Court's rejection of the notion that the Fourteenth Amendment and its Privileges or Immunities Clause had been intended to transform American government. Speaking of the Court's objection that a broad reading of the Clause would make it a "perpetual censor" on state governments, Swayne said that Congress and the states had been aware of that when they adopted the Fourteenth Amendment.

Subsequent developments

The victory of the Crescent City Company survived for only 11 years. By 1879, the State of Louisiana had adopted a new constitution prohibiting the state's ability to grant slaughterhouse monopolies, devolving regulation of cattle slaughter to parishes and municipalities, and banning the subordinate governmental units from granting monopoly rights over such activities. Having essentially lost its monopoly protection, the Crescent City Co. sued. That case ended in Butchers' Union Co. v. Crescent City Co. (1884), with the Supreme Court holding that Crescent City Co. did not have a contract with the state and so that revocation of the monopoly privilege was not a violation of the Contract Clause.

Analysis
The Slaughter-House Cases essentially "gutted" the Privileges or Immunities Clause. The American scholar Edward Samuel Corwin remarked: "Unique among constitutional provisions, the privileges and immunities clause of the Fourteenth Amendment enjoys the distinction of having been rendered a practical nullity by a single decision of the Supreme Court rendered within five years after its ratification."

In 2001, the American legal scholar Akhil Amar wrote of the Slaughter-House Cases: "Virtually no serious modern scholar—left, right, and center—thinks that the decision is a plausible reading of the [Fourteenth] Amendment."

On the other hand, Kevin Gutzman, a U.S. constitutional scholar and historian, argues that the Fourteenth Amendment was originally meant to protect only "specifically federal rights" and describes the later, broader interpretation of the Amendment as "the Court's [use of] the Fourteenth Amendment to claim a capacious national judicial authority". Gutzman believes that "legal academics despise the Slaughterhouse decision because they do think the federal courts should be 'a perpetual censor upon all legislation in the States.

Kevin Newsom, who was later appointed by Donald Trump to serve as a federal appeals court judge for the Eleventh Circuit, wrote in 2000 that the Slaughter-House Cases are consistent with using the Privileges or Immunities Clause to apply the federal Bill of Rights against the states, but not for applying unenumerated rights against the states.

See also
 Chase Court

References

Footnotes

Citations

Works cited

External links

Can the Slaughter-House Cases Be Saved from Its Critics? – Pamela Brandwein (University of Texas at Dallas)
Slaughterhouse Cases – PBS.com
 "Supreme Court Landmark Case, Slaughterhouse Cases" from C-SPAN's Landmark Cases: Historic Supreme Court Decisions

1870s in the environment
1873 in United States case law
1873 in Louisiana
History of civil rights in the United States
Water supply and sanitation in the United States
Health in Louisiana
Legal history of Louisiana
Economy of New Orleans
19th century in New Orleans
Privileges or Immunities case law
United States equal protection case law
United States substantive due process case law
United States Thirteenth Amendment case law
United States Supreme Court cases of the Chase Court
Meat processing in the United States
United States Supreme Court cases